Doris bertheloti is a species of sea slug, a dorid nudibranch, a marine gastropod mollusk in the family Dorididae.

Distribution
This species was described from the Canary Islands. It has been reported from the Mediterranean Sea and Senegal.

References

Dorididae
Molluscs of the Atlantic Ocean
Molluscs of the Mediterranean Sea
Gastropods described in 1839
Taxa named by Alcide d'Orbigny